The Bunker is a 1981 American made-for-television historical war film produced by Time-Life Productions based on the 1975 book The Bunker by James P. O'Donnell.

The film, directed by George Schaefer and adapted for the screen by John Gay, is a dramatisation depicting the events surrounding Adolf Hitler's last weeks in and around his underground bunker in Berlin before and during the Battle of Berlin. The film stars Anthony Hopkins as Hitler, plus an all star cast including Richard Jordan, Susan Blakely, and Cliff Gorman.

Plot 
The film opens in 1945, with American correspondent James O'Donnell (James Naughton) gaining entry to the Führerbunker by bribing a Soviet sentry with a packet of cigarettes. The film then tells the story of the occupants of the bunker between January and May 1945 as an extended flashback. A number of historical events and the reactions of the bunker's residents are presented, including the encirclement of Berlin, Hitler's last meeting with Albert Speer and the attempts by Speer to sabotage Hitler's scorched earth policy, Speer's abortive plan to kill Hitler in the bunker, Hitler's dismissal of Heinz Guderian, Hitler's firing of Heinrich Himmler and Hermann Goering, the failure of German forces to lift the siege, the murder of the Goebbels children, Hitler's wedding to Eva Braun, and the suicides of Hitler, Braun and the Goebbels'.

The film ends as groups of survivors are leaving the bunker complex of the Reich Chancellery. The final scene depicts the bunker's mechanic and final occupant, Hentschel, listening to a radio announcement that Hitler has died fighting. He throws a set of papers at the radio in disgust and the scene dissolves to a series of still images with voiceover explaining the fate of the remaining survivors. The last still image is of Hitler giving a speech during his rise to power, with O'Donnel's voiceover:

It was Thomas Hardy who said 'While much is too strange to be believed, nothing is too strange to have happened.' 

The still then comes to life briefly, depicting Hitler giving a political speech. The scene dissolves into the final still image of the ruined bunker as the credits roll.

Production
The actors' interpretations of the events differ in ways from the traditional accounts. For example, during the final meeting between Hitler and Albert Speer, Hopkins adopts a sarcastic tone and gestures (including mock applause) that suggest that Hitler was already aware of Speer's betrayal, even though he uses the exact words recounted by the witnesses. This became a fairly controversial scene due to a perception in some circles that the resemblance to Jesus Christ's legendary foreseeing of Judas's betrayal was intentional. These accusations were consistently denied, as were reports regarding a rumoured on-set romance between Piper Laurie (Magda Goebbels) and Cliff Gorman (Joseph Goebbels).

The film shifts the point-of-view character regularly, and characters who are not known to have left their experiences on record often tell the story. Dr. Werner Haase is used in this manner, even though he was never interviewed (having died in late 1950). Likewise, two scenes are written from the viewpoint of Hitler's cook, Constanze Manziarly, and in one scene, Manziarly actually has a flashback, remembering happier days. However, Manziarly disappeared while escaping from the bunker, so neither O'Donnell nor any other person was able to interview her or get her viewpoint.

The ending is also influenced by O'Donnell's book and its focus on the bunker itself, ending just as the main surviving characters are leaving the bunker.

Cast
 Anthony Hopkins as Adolf Hitler
 Richard Jordan as Albert Speer
 Cliff Gorman as Joseph Goebbels
 James Naughton as James P. O'Donnell
 Michel Lonsdale as Martin Bormann
 Piper Laurie as Magda Goebbels
 Susan Blakely as Eva Braun
 Martin Jarvis as Johannes Hentschel
 Michael Kitchen as Rochus Misch
 Robert Austin as Walter Wagner
 Andrew Ray as Otto Günsche
 Yves Brainville as Heinz Guderian
 Michael Culver as Wilhelm Mohnke
 Julian Fellowes as Nicolaus von Below
 Frank Gatliff as Ernst-Günther Schenck
 David Swift as Johann Rattenhuber
 Terrence Hardiman as Hermann Fegelein
 Edward Hardwicke as Dieter Stahl
 Karl Held as Hans Baur
 David King as Hermann Göring
 Sarah Marshall as Traudl Junge
 John Paul as Wilhelm Keitel
 Morris Perry as Werner Haase
 Pam St. Clement as Constanze Manziarly
 John Sharp as Theodor Morell
 Michael Sheard as Heinrich Himmler
 Tony Steedman as Alfred Jodl
 Peggy Frankston as Margarete Speer

In a short scene at the beginning of the film, a younger O'Donnell is played by actor James Naughton. O'Donnell himself provided brief voice-over narrations at the beginning and end of the film.

Anthony Hopkins won an Emmy for his portrayal of Adolf Hitler. Actors on the set claimed his performance was so convincing that those playing German soldiers snapped to attention whenever Hopkins came onto the set, even if he wasn't in character.

Actors Michael Sheard (Himmler) and Tony Steedman (Jodl) reprised their characters from the 1973 British television film The Death of Adolf Hitler.

Awards 

Won:

 Primetime Emmy Award for Outstanding Lead Actor in a Miniseries or a Movie: Anthony Hopkins

Nominated:

 Primetime Emmy Award for Outstanding Supporting Actress in a Miniseries or a Movie: Piper Laurie
 Primetime Emmy Award for Outstanding Sound Editing for a Miniseries, Movie or a Special
 René Magnol (production mixer)
 Robert L. Harman (re-recording mixer)
 William L. McCaughey (re-recording mixer)
 Howard S. Wollman (re-recording mixer)

See also
Downfall, 2004 film

References

External links

1981 television films
1981 films
1980s historical films
1980s war films
Films about Adolf Hitler
CBS network films
Cultural depictions of Adolf Hitler
Cultural depictions of Eva Braun
Cultural depictions of Joseph Goebbels
Cultural depictions of Albert Speer
Films based on biographies
Films directed by George Schaefer
French television films
Films with screenplays by John Gay (screenwriter)
Works about the Battle of Berlin
World War II films based on actual events
Films set in bunkers